The Red Mountain Suburbs Historic District, in Jefferson County, Alabama, including parts of Birmingham and Mountain Brook, is a  historic district which was listed on the National Register of Historic Places in 1985.  The listing included 392 contributing buildings and three contributing structures.

It is roughly bounded by Crest and Argyle and Altamont, Country Club, Salisbury, and Lanark Roads.  Its boundaries were drawn to include the original (early 1900s) plats of the Valley View, Milner Heights, Altamont/Redmont Drives and Redmont Park subdivisions, all being "exclusive and upper middle class suburban neighboods".

It is asserted to include the state's best examples of Tudor Revival, Spanish Revival, Chateauesque, Classical Revival, Dutch Revival and Colonial Revival architecture, as well as great landscape architecture.

References

Buildings and structures completed in 1911
Historic districts in Jefferson County, Alabama
Historic districts on the National Register of Historic Places in Alabama
Mountain Brook, Alabama
National Register of Historic Places in Birmingham, Alabama
National Register of Historic Places in Jefferson County, Alabama
Renaissance Revival architecture in Alabama